Argosarchus is a monotypic genus in the family Phasmatidae containing the single species Argosarchus horridus, or the New Zealand bristly stick insect, a stick insect  endemic to New Zealand (Argosarchus spiniger is now considered a junior synonym of A. horridus). The name "horridus" means bristly in Latin, likely referring to its spiny thorax.

Description 

A distinguishing feature is the coxa of the two forelegs is purple or pink. Females are much larger than males and have a visibly spiny thorax. The colour of A. horridus ranges from pale white to dark brown, with females usually being grey and males being a dark greenish-brown or dark brown.

Life cycle and mating behaviour 

Like many other New Zealand stick insects, A. horridus is facultatively parthenogenetic. Because of that, some populations consist of only females who reproduce asexually, while other populations have both males and females and can reproduce by either asexual or sexual reproduction. Adults hatch in early summer and can be seen hanging off their host plant, feeding on it. They are mostly active at night, with males actively searching for females.

Males will mate with females by climbing on to their back, and using the toothed claspers near their genitalia to attach and begin copulation. Males may remain clasped onto a female, even if not mating, in order to mate-guard. Mature females lay eggs continuously throughout their adult life, indiscriminately dropping them to the ground. The large eggs resemble plant seeds, and are well-camouflaged on the forest floor. Eggs hatch in early spring, and nymphs resemble miniature adults. Like other stick insects, A. horridus is hemimetabolous, and nymphs grow by moulting, going through six instars until final adulthood.

Habitat and distribution 
A. horridus is found throughout much of the North Island, as well as some parts of the South Island. It is present in coastal areas from sea level to at least 900 m a.s.l. The species is absent in the central South Island and in high-altitude areas. It has also been found on a number of offshore islands, including the Chatham Islands. On the Chatham Islands only females occur and this population was once considered a different species (A. schauinslandi). It can be found in gardens on ramarama (Lophomyrtus bullata) and in the wild on native and introduced Rubus species (Rosaceae) and climbing rata (Metrosideros perforata). Because of its wide distribution, range of host plants and the various habitats it is found in, A. horridus is considered an ecological generalist.

See also 
 List of stick insects of New Zealand

References

External links 
 Argosarchus horridus discussed on RNZ Critter of the Week, 22 February 2019

Phasmatidae of New Zealand
Endemic fauna of New Zealand
Insects described in 1846
Taxa named by Adam White (zoologist)
Monotypic insect genera
Phasmatodea genera
Endemic insects of New Zealand